Demta, also known as Sowari and Muris, is a Papuan language on the north coast of Papua, Indonesia. It is spoken in Ambora, Muris Besar, Muris Kecil, and Yougafsa villages, all located in Demta District.

Further reading
Kim, So Hyun. 2006. Survey Report on the Sowari Language of Papua, Indonesia. Unpublished report. Jayapura: SIL Indonesia.

References

Languages of western New Guinea

Demta–Sentani languages